The 1927 National Championship (Serbo-Croato-Slovenian: Državno prvenstvo 1927. / Државно првенство 1927.) was the first year in which the championship was played in a  league system, with Hajduk Split being the first national league champion. Newcomer BSK Beograd replaced Jugoslavija Beograd as Serbia's top-performing club, this was due to half of the Jugoslavija players switching clubs to play for BSK. Hajduk and second-place club BSK entered the 1927 Mitropa Cup.

Qualifiers
For the final stage of the national championship, the clubs were qualified through their subassociation competitions, although this year, the major subassociations of Belgrade and Zagreb gave each two teams for the qualifying stage, qualifying the subassociation champions directly, while the second placed will participate in a qualifying round.  Hajduk Split also qualified directly as Cup winner, while the champions of the rest of the subassociations played the qualifying round.

The representatives were:

Subassociation of Belgrade: BSK Belgrade (qualified directly) and SK Jugoslavija
Subassociation of Zagreb: HAŠK (qualified directly) and Građanski Zagreb
Subassociation of Ljubljana: Ilirija
Subassociation of Osijek: Hajduk Osijek
Subassociation of Sarajevo: SAŠK
Subassociation of Split: Hajduk Split
Subassociation of Subotica: SAND Subotica

Qualifying round:
Ljubljana, May 26: Ilirija – Građanski 5:0
Sarajevo, May 29: SAŠK – Jugoslavija 2:1
Osijek, May 29: Hajduk Osijek – SAND 2:2

The qualified teams were Ilirija, SAŠK and SAND.  The elimination of Građanski and Jugoslavija, both former national champions, was a major surprise.  The qualification was played only in one round.  As Hajduk Osijek and SAND ended tied in their match, an additional match between them was played in Osijek on May 30 which qualified SAND.

League table

Results

Top scorers
Final goalscoring position, number of goals, player/players and club.
1 - 6 goals - Kuzman Sotirović (BSK Belgrade)
2 - 4 goals - Antun Bonačić, Vinko Radić (both Hajduk Split), Branko Zinaja (HAŠK)

Winning squad
Champions:

HAJDUK SPLIT (coach: Luka Kaliterna)

Otmar Gazzari
Renzo Gazzari
Ivan Montana
Miroslav Dešković
Mihovil Borovčić Kurir
Veljko Poduje
Šime Poduje
Leo Lemešić
Mirko Bonačić
Antun Bonačić
Vinko Radić
Petar Borovčić Kurir

See also
Yugoslav Cup
Yugoslav League Championship
Football Association of Yugoslavia

References

External links
Yugoslavia Domestic Football Full Tables

1
Yugoslav Football Championship